The 1941 Rose Bowl was the 27th edition of the college football bowl game, played at the Rose Bowl in Pasadena, California, on Wednesday, January 1. The undefeated and second-ranked Stanford Indians of the Pacific Coast Conference defeated the #7 Nebraska Cornhuskers of the Big Six Conference, 21–13.

This was Nebraska's first bowl game and the eighth for Stanford, all in the Rose Bowl. Through 2020, it remains the only meeting between these football programs.

Teams

Nebraska Cornhuskers

Nebraska was 8–1 going into the Rose Bowl and ranked seventh in the nation; their only blemish was a 13–7 loss at  top-ranked Minnesota, who did not play in a bowl game.  After the announcement of the Rose Bowl acceptance, the celebration that followed lasted for 24 hours in Lincoln, according to newspaper reports. University classes were canceled, and students stormed the state capitol, demanding that the governor lead the singing of the school song, "There Is No Place Like Nebraska."  Led by fourth-year head coach Biff Jones, the Cornhuskers had two All-Americans: Warren Alfson and Forrest Behm.

Stanford Indians

Stanford was led by first-year head coach Clark Shaughnessy, who would bring a revolutionary football style called the T formation.
This new style of playing was filled with tricks, fakes, and pitchouts that helped the Indians to a perfect 9–0 regular season and a nickname of the "Wow Boys."  The new features of the style involved quarterback Frankie Albert taking the snap directly from the center.

The year before in 1939, the Indians were winless in their seven conference games under seventh-year head coach Tiny Thornhill and finished 1–7–1 overall.

Game summary

Scoring

First quarter
NEBR - Vike Francis 2 run (Francis kick). 
STAN - Hugh Gallarneau 9 run (Frankie Albert kick).

Second quarter
NEBR - Allen Zikmund 33 pass from Herm Rohrig (kick blocked). 
STAN - Gallarneau 41 pass from Albert (Albert kick).

Third quarter
STAN - Pete Kmetovic 39 punt return (Albert kick)

Fourth quarter
No Scoring

Highlight of the game
The highlight of the game is often considered to be one of the best plays in Rose Bowl history. The Indians drove from their own 23-yard line to the Cornhusker one-yard line before a valiant goal-line stand by Nebraska denied Stanford the end zone. Stanford had four cracks at the end zone from the one-yard line, but the Cornhuskers held each time.

Trailing by one point late in the third quarter, Nebraska took over on their own one and opted to punt on first down, which started the play of the game. Kmetovic took the punt at the Cornhusker 40-yard line and dashed and darted his way to the end zone, giving Stanford a 21–13 lead, which was the final score.

Statistics
{| class=wikitable style="text-align:center"
|-
! Team Stats
! Stanford
! Nebraska
|-
| First downs  
| 15
| 9
|-
| Rushing yards  
| 202
| 58
|-
| Passing (att–com–int)
| 13–6–2
| 14–4–0
|-
| Passing yards  
| 68
| 85
|-
| Total offense  
| 375
| 128
|}
Note: Both schools report slightly different stats, these stats are from Nebraska's records

Aftermath
This game is generally considered the clincher that convinced football pundits that the T formation style was the offense of the future.

As the program's first bowl, the game retains a special place in Cornhuskers history; Hall of Fame head coach Bob Devaney arrived in 1962 and used to joke that he'd been in the state several years before he found out that Nebraska had actually lost the 1941 Rose Bowl.

Trivia
This game is described in detail by David Dodge in his mystery novel, Shear the Black Sheep, published in 1942.

References

External links
 1941 Rose Bowl film, Harold Chenoweth Film Collection, Archives & Special Collections, Dr. C.C. and Mabel L. Criss Library, University of Nebraska at Omaha.

Rose Bowl
Rose Bowl Game
Nebraska Cornhuskers football bowl games
Stanford Cardinal football bowl games
Rose Bowl
January 1941 sports events